Solomon Township may refer to the following townships in the United States:

 Solomon Township, Cloud County, Kansas
 Solomon Township, Graham County, Kansas
 Solomon Township, Sheridan County, Kansas